George Dodge, Jr. was an American politician and a Democratic member of the New Mexico House of Representatives representing District 63 from January 2011 to January 2019.

Education
Dodge earned his bachelor's degree in history and political science and his master's degree in education administration from New Mexico Highlands University.

Elections
2012 Dodge was challenged by his 2010 primary opponent in the June 5, 2012 Democratic Primary; Dodge won with 1,544 votes (79.7%) and won the November 6, 2012 General election with 4,881 votes (63.5%) against Republican nominee Steven Hanson.
2010 When District 63 Democratic Representative Jose Campos ran for Lieutenant Governor of New Mexico, Dodge won the June 1, 2010 Democratic Primary with 1,450 votes (78%) and won the November 2, 2010 General election with 2,638 votes (54.5%) against Republican nominee Melinda Russ.

References

External links
Official page at the New Mexico Legislature

George Dodge at Ballotpedia
George Dodge, Jr. at the National Institute on Money in State Politics

Place of birth missing (living people)
Year of birth missing (living people)
Living people
Democratic Party members of the New Mexico House of Representatives
New Mexico Highlands University alumni
21st-century American politicians
People from Santa Rosa, New Mexico